The 2017 Allan Cup was the Canadian championship of senior ice hockey and the 109th year the Allan Cup was awarded.  The tournament was played at the J.K. Irving Centre in Bouctouche, New Brunswick from April 10 to 15, 2017 and won by the Grand Falls-Windsor Cataracts.

Information
Kenora, Ontario was originally named the host city for the 2017 national championship.  Following the dissolution of the Kenora Thistles senior hockey club in 2016, Hockey Canada awarded hosting duties to the community of Bouctouche and the Bouctouche Dodge Rams JCs.

Former professional hockey players competing in this year's Allan Cup were: Aaron Asham (Bouctouche), Ryan Bonni (South East), Steve Christie (South East), Ryan O'Marra (Stoney Creek), Terry Yake (South East), and Tyler Sloan (Grand Falls-Windsor).

Participants
Bouctouche Dodge Rams JCs (Host)
Lacombe Generals (Pacific)
2009, 2013, and 2016 Allan Cup champions (as Bentley Generals)
19-3-0 record, 1st in ChHL.
Defeated Fort Saskatchewan Chiefs 4-0; Defeated Stony Plain Eagles 4-2 to win league.
Automatically advanced as British Columbia did not present a champion for McKenzie Cup.
South East Prairie Thunder (West)
2012 and 2015 Allan Cup champions
Defeated Île-des-Chênes North Stars 3-0 to win Pattison Cup.
Defeated Rosetown Red Wings to win Rathgaber Cup.
Stoney Creek Generals (Ontario)
18-4-2 record, 1st in ACH.
Defeated Dundas Real McCoys 4-0, defeated Whitby Dunlops 4-1 to win league.
Automatically advanced as Northwestern Ontario did not present a champion for Renwick Cup.
Lamèque Au P'tit Mousse  (Atlantic)
Defeated Elsipogtog Hawks.
No regional playoff as Newfoundland & Labrador representative awarded Quebec's berth.
Grand Falls-Windsor Cataracts (Newfoundland & Labrador)
Host region awarded Quebec's spot.
Previous season's Herder Memorial Trophy winner.

Round robin

Full standings and statistics available at Pointstreak.com.

Results

Championship Round

Quarter and Semi-finals

Final

References

External links
Official Allan Cup Site 
Allen Cup Site at HockeyCanada.ca

2016–17 in Canadian ice hockey
Allan Cup
2017 Allan Cup
Ice hockey competitions in New Brunswick